Preeriella is a genus of thrips in the family Phlaeothripidae.

Species
 Preeriella angolensis
 Preeriella armigera
 Preeriella bournieri
 Preeriella brevicornis
 Preeriella crassisetis
 Preeriella discors
 Preeriella formosana
 Preeriella fumosa
 Preeriella jacotia
 Preeriella macilenta
 Preeriella major
 Preeriella malaya
 Preeriella marginata
 Preeriella microsoma
 Preeriella minutus
 Preeriella moundi
 Preeriella parvula
 Preeriella pitkini
 Preeriella secticornis
 Preeriella totanaca

References

Phlaeothripidae
Thrips
Thrips genera